Fazlul Huq Muslim Hall is one of the oldest residential halls of Dhaka University.

History

Establishment
Fazlul Huq Muslim Hall was established in 1940 and named after A. K. Fazlul Huq, former prime minister of undivided Bengal. Fazlul Huq played a major part for establishing Dhaka University. The hall commenced its activity on 1st July, 1940 with 363 students including include 231 residential students, 132 non-residential students and 3 female students. On 16 June 1972, the Syndicate of Dhaka University removed the term "Muslim" from name. The decision was challenged in court by Advocate Shamsul Alam. On 1 March 2004, Bangladesh High Court ordered the University authorities to restore the original name, with "Muslim" included.

The linguist Dr. Muhammad Shahidullah was the first provost of the hall. Prof. Dr. Shah Md. Masum is the current provost of the hall.

Establishment of East Pakistan Muslim Students' League 
Sheikh Mujibur Rahman was politically active on Fazlul Haq Muslim Hall, even though he was not an residential student of the hall.  On 4th January, 1948, East Pakistan Muslim Students' League was established in a meeting organized at Fazlul Haq Muslim Hall Auditorium and after establishment of the political group, Sheikh Mujibur Rahman came out as an influential leader.

Language Movement

In January 15, 1948, the National Language Sub-Committee Office of the National Language Action Committee was relocated to Fazlul Haq Muslim Hall at the proposal made by Muhammad Twaha, the then DUCSU vice president of the hall committee.  On 2nd March, 1948, The second National Language Action Committe (সর্বদলীয় রাষ্ট্রভাষা সংগ্রাম পরিষদ) , which was a coalition of Tamaddun Majlish and East Pakistan Muslim Students' League, was also formed at a meeting presided by Sheikh Mujibur Rahman in this hall to strengthen language movement.

Facilities
The hall consists  which was afo residential buildings:
 The three-storey main building 
 The five-storey south building
The hall has a capacity of a total of 244 rooms with 766 seats. Although, there are almost twice as many residential students who currently reside there exceeding the hall's total capacity.

The hall has a library with books on different subjects. The library is open for non-resident as well as resident students every working day. New books are purchased in every academic year from the University fund.

Annual sports are organized every year.

Fazlul Haq Muslim Hall Debating Club hosts the National Science Debating Festival annually.

Gallery

References

External links
Alumni association of Fazlul Huq Muslim Hall 
Official website of University of Dhaka

Buildings and structures in Dhaka
University and college residential buildings
1940 establishments in India
University of Dhaka halls of residence